The Mogoșoaia was a Romanian ferry which sank due to a collision with a push barge convoy on 10 September 1989. Of the 255 people on board only 16 survived. The incident happened when the Mogoșoaia was sailing across the Danube from Galați to Grindu in thick fog. The ship was carrying food and iron.

See also 
 List of disasters in Romania by death toll

References  

Shipwrecks of Romania
Maritime incidents in 1989